Azeia was a town of the ancient Troad.

It was a member of the Delian League; the inhabitants of Azeia are cited in the tribute records of Athens between the years 452/1 and 415/4 BCE. The inhabitants are supposed to be identified with the demonym Azeiotai (Ἀζειώται)
mentioned by Stephanus of Byzantium, quoting a fragment of Hellanicus of Lesbos. It has also been related to the patronymic "Azida", mentioned by Homer in the Iliad.

Its site is unlocated.

References

Populated places in ancient Troad
Former populated places in Turkey
Greek city-states
Members of the Delian League
Lost ancient cities and towns